Madonna of Constantinople is a c. 1656 oil on canvas painting by Mattia Preti. It was the first of many works commissioned as ex-votos for freeing the city from the plague of 1656 – they all showed the Madonna with a selection of the city's patron saints, in this case Joseph (left background), Januarius (right background), Roch (bottom left), Nicasius (bottom right) and Rosalia (centre). It now hangs in the Museo nazionale di Capodimonte in Naples.

References

Bibliography
  Nicola Spinosa, Mattia Preti. Tra Roma, Napoli e Malta, 1ª ed., Napoli, Electa Napoli, 1999, ISBN 88-435-8799-4
  Nicola Spinosa, 'Da Mattia Preti a Luca Giordano - natura in posa', in Pittura del Seicento a Napoli, Napoli, Arte'm, 2011

Paintings by Mattia Preti
Paintings in the collection of the Museo di Capodimonte
Paintings of the Madonna and Child
1656 paintings
Paintings of Saint Roch
Paintings of Saint Joseph
Paintings of Saint Rosalia
Paintings of Januarius